The Sweetness of Water is the debut novel by American novelist Nathan Harris. It was published by Little, Brown and Company on June 15, 2021. It was longlisted for the 2021 Booker Prize.

Summary 
The Sweetness of Water is set in the fictional town of Old Ox, Georgia, during the final period of the Civil War. The story follows two Black brothers, Prentiss and Landry, freed by the Emancipation Proclamation, as they try to make money for their trek north to reunite with their mother. The novel also features a parallel narrative following the taboo romance between two gay male Confederate soldiers.

Background 
After graduating from the University of Oregon, Nathan Harris moved to San Francisco. He worked a number of jobs, including food delivery for Postmates and legal assistant work for his mother who is an attorney. Between 2013 and 2015, Harris worked on writing a novel in the mornings and evenings between his afternoon work. Harris finished the novel while as a fellow at the Michener Center for Writers. During his third year of the program, Harris secured a literary agent, Emily Forland at Brandt & Hochman, who sent his manuscript to editors in June 2019. His debut novel, The Sweetness of Water, was published by Little, Brown and Company on June 15, 2021. It was simultaneously published by Tinder Press in the United Kingdom.

Reception 
The novel was an overnight sensation. It received positive reviews from critics and was selected by Oprah Winfrey as part of Oprah's Book Club on June 15, 2021. It was also chosen by Barack Obama as part of his 2021 summer reading list. The novel became a bestseller and was awarded the 2021 Ernest J. Gaines Award for Literary Excellence. It was also shortlisted for the 2022 Dylan Thomas Prize, and longlisted for the 2021 Booker Prize and the 2022 Andrew Carnegie Medal for Excellence in Fiction.

References 

2021 American novels
2021 debut novels
Little, Brown and Company books
Novels set in Georgia (U.S. state)
Novels set during the American Civil War
Novels about American slavery
2020s LGBT novels
Novels with gay themes
Tinder Press books
American LGBT novels